The following is a list of Cabinets of the Philippines by the President of the Philippines under which they operated.

Emilio Aguinaldo (1899–1901)

Manuel L. Quezon (1935–1944)

Appointments (1935–1941)

War Cabinet (1941–1944) 
The outbreak of World War II and the Japanese invasion resulted in periodic and drastic changes to the government structure. Executive Order 390, December 22, 1941, abolished the Department of the Interior and established a new line of succession. Executive Order 396, December 24, 1941, further reorganized and grouped the cabinet, with the functions of Secretary of Justice assigned to the Chief Justice of the Supreme Court of the Philippines.

Jose P. Laurel (1943–1945)

Sergio Osmeña (1944–1946)

War Cabinet (1944–1945) 
On August 8, 1944, President Osmeña issued Executive Order 15-W reorganizing and consolidating the executive departments of the Commonwealth government. The reorganization of the government after it was reestablished on Philippine soil was undertaken with Executive Order No. 27; February 27, 1945.

Cabinet and judicial appointments (1945–1946) 
Executive Order No. 27; February 27, 1945, was issued upon the restoration of civilian authority to the government of the Commonwealth, and members of the new cabinet appointed on March 8, 1945. Subsequent renaming and mergers of departments have separate listings.

Manuel Roxas (1946–1948)

Elpidio Quirino (1948–1953)

Ramon Magsaysay (1953–1957)

Carlos P. Garcia (1957–1961)

Diosdado Macapagal (1961–1965)

Ferdinand Marcos (1965–1986)

First and second terms in the Third Republic (1965–1972)

Martial law period until 1986

Corazon Aquino (1986–1992)

Ministerial Cabinet (1986)

Presidential Cabinet (1986-1992)
The parliamentary system government was replaced by a presidential system government that was created by the 1986 provisional Freedom Constitution. The cabinet largely remained the same upon the official ratification and enactment of the 1987 constitution on February 2, 1987.

Fidel V. Ramos (1992–1998)

Joseph Ejercito Estrada (1998–2001)

Gloria Macapagal Arroyo (2001–2010)

Benigno S. Aquino III (2010–2016)

Rodrigo Roa Duterte (2016–2022)

Ferdinand R. Marcos Jr. (2022–present)

References

External links
 The Executive Branch – Official Gazette of the Republic of the Philippines

Cabinet of the Philippines
Philippines
Philippines politics-related lists